This article lists the chapters of Phi Delta Theta. Chapters are listed with their installation date, university and status. The information was gathered from a mixture of Baird's Manual and the online archive, The Scroll, The Chapter lists, and the locate chapter function on the national website.

Chapter designation naming 
Chapter designation is determined by the order in which each chapter was awarded its charter in the state or province in which it is located (i.e., the first chapter established in a state/province is designated "Alpha", the second is "Beta", the third "Gamma", and so on). Exceptions to this rule have occurred when two universities, each with their own chapter, merge, causing the chapters to also merge. This results in the hyphened name of the two chapters that make up the new one (see Illinois Delta-Zeta).

Phi Delta Theta provinces 
To assist with the administration of its many chapters, Phi Delta Theta groups chapters together in a province. Each province has a President, who acts as a connection point between the Undergraduate chapters and Phi Delta Theta headquarter. Each province has a Greek letter as its name. When a province gets too large, it is split and each new province keeps its Greek letter while also adding a direction.

Undergraduate chapters in the United States and Canada

References 

Lists of chapters of United States student societies by society
chapters